Valdáliga is a municipality in Cantabria, Spain.

References

Municipalities in Cantabria